Laurenţiu Petean (born 5 May 1988) is a Romanian footballer who plays for German lower leagues club Bahlinger SC. He made his debut for the first team of Oțelul Galați in July 2010.

Honours

FC Oțelul Galați
Liga I: 2010–11

References

External links

1988 births
Living people
Romanian footballers
Association football defenders
Association football midfielders
Liga I players
Liga II players
ASC Oțelul Galați players
FC Delta Dobrogea Tulcea players
FC Petrolul Ploiești players
AFC Săgeata Năvodari players
AFC Dacia Unirea Brăila players
Romanian expatriate footballers
Romanian expatriate sportspeople in Germany
Expatriate footballers in Germany
Bahlinger SC players